Fair Oaks is a census-designated place in Fairfax County, Virginia, United States. The population as of the 2010 census was 30,223. It encompasses a large area west of the city of Fairfax, centered on Fair Oaks Mall. Suburban neighborhoods and office parks occupy most of Fair Oaks, largely developed since the 1980s.

The Fair Oaks CDP is bordered by Fair Lakes and Greenbriar to the west, and by Oakton and Fairfax city to the east. The Fair Oaks Mall is at the center of the CDP, in the angle formed by U.S. Route 50 to the northeast and Interstate 66 to the south, which intersect at I-66's Exit 57. I-66 leads east  to Washington, D.C., and west  to Strasburg, Virginia. U.S. 50 leads east into Fairfax and Washington and northwest  to Winchester, Virginia. U.S. Route 29 forms the southern border of the CDP, leading east into Fairfax and Washington and west  to Gainesville.

References

Census-designated places in Fairfax County, Virginia
Washington metropolitan area
Census-designated places in Virginia